The 7th Guards Missile Rezhitskaya Red Flag division (7 GRD), abbreviated as 7 RD, is a military unit (14245) of the 27th Guards Missile Army, Strategic Rocket Forces located in Ozyorny, Bologovsky District, Tver Oblast, Russia.

History 
On July 14, 1943, the 19th Separate Guards Cannon Artillery Brigade was formed based on the 79th Guards Cannon Artillery Regiment in the area of Staraya Russa. On July 27, 1944, the brigade was awarded the honorary title of "Rezhitskaya" for bravery and heroism shown by its personnel during battles for the seizure of the city of Rēzekne in Latvia, as commended by the Supreme Commander-in-Chief.

During the Great Patriotic War, the brigade fought from Staraya Russa to Saldus (Latvia), with Colonel M.I. Sokolov commanding the brigade throughout the war. The actions of the entire brigade personnel were highly appreciated by the Supreme Commander-in-Chief, and 1,200 people were awarded government awards.

In June 1960, the 7th Rocket Engineering Brigade was formed in accordance with the directive of the Minister of Defense of the USSR, dated May 25, 1960. The new brigade was formed based on the 19th Guards Cannon Artillery Rezhitskoy Brigade, which was relocated from the settlement of Gatchina to the village of Vypolzovo in the Kalinin Oblast (Bologoye-4). The formation took place in the housing of the 25th Mixed Aviation Division of the 6th Separate Air Defense Army, with Guard Colonel P.P. Uvarov appointed as the Missile Brigade Commander. The brigade consisted of 9,000 personnel, including soldiers and sergeants. Initially, the brigade was part of the 46th training artillery range. From March 10, 1961, it became part of the 3rd Separate Guards Missile Corps.

The first unit to be formed was the missile regiment (military unit 14264) consisting of three divisions: two with ground launchers and one with a silo launcher. On November 30, 1960, the brigade commander reported to the Supreme Commander-in-Chief that the formation of the missile brigade - military unit 14245 - had been completed. Starting from the beginning of 1961, planned training with the R-5 missile commenced.

On May 30, 1961, by the directive of the Minister of Defense of the USSR, the 7th Missile Brigade was transformed into the 7th Missile Division of central subordination. On April 14, 1961, to preserve the combat traditions and memory of the military merits shown by the soldiers of the 19th Separate Guards Cannon Artillery Brigade during the Great Patriotic War, the honorary title "Guard Rezhitskaya" was assigned to the unit. The division included: 4 rocket regiments (military units 14264, 14474, 14420, 14443), a repair and technical base (RTB), a communication unit, and support units. The annual celebration date remained the same - July 14, 1943. On July 16, 1961, the unit was awarded the Red Banner.

On August 16, 1961, Division Captain of the 3rd rank L.S. Shvygin conducted the first launch of the R-5 missile (8K51) in the history of the division at the Kapustin Yar range and received a rating of "good." In December 1962, the combat crew of the first division of one of the missile regiments (unit 14264) conducted the first standard launch of the R-16 missile (8K64) for the division at the Baikonur range.

On February 11, 1963, the first division (BSP-12) went on combat duty (BD) with two R-16s with ground launchers. In total, six divisions (BSP) went on BD in 1963-1964, four with ground launchers and two with silo launchers.

On May 24, 1963, shortly after the end of the Cuban Missile Crisis, in an atmosphere of the strictest secrecy, the division was visited by N.S. Khrushchev, Cuban leader Fidel Castro, Marshal of the Soviet Union R.Ya. Malinovsky, and Marshal of the Soviet Union N.I. Krylov, the Commander-in-Chief of the Strategic Rocket Forces. Khrushchev introduced Castro to the new R-16 missile.

On March 20, 1964, the division was incorporated into the 3rd Separate Guards Rocket Corps with R-16 missiles (8K64). In June 1964, missile regiments were established based on the division: military units 14264, 07382, 12408, 14474, 57388, 74201, 14420, and 68528. The combat duty positions of the regiments were located near the borders of the Tver and Novgorod regions.

From 1965, the division began preparing for the construction of missile complexes of a new generation with individual launchers (OS). In accordance with the General Staff directive of March 31, 1966, six missile regiments "OS" with UR-100 missiles (8K84) were formed. In 1967, the first "OS" regiment, military unit __, went on combat duty.

On November 1, 1967, the division was awarded the commemorative Banner of the Central Committee of the CPSU, the Presidium of the Supreme Soviet of the USSR, and the Council of Ministers of the USSR for successes in military work on the occasion of the 50th anniversary of the Great October Socialist Revolution.

From April 1970 to June 30, 1990, the division was part of the 50th Rocket Army (in Smolensk). In April 1970, five more regiments began rearming with the UR-100 missile complex.

Starting in 1973, work began to remove the UR-100 from combat duty and deploy new 15P015 complexes with the MR-UR-100 missile (15A15) (from 1977, replaced by the 15P016 complex with the MR-UR-100U). The first regiment with the 15A15 missile went on combat duty on May 6, 1975. Between October 15, 1975, and October 3, 1978, eight more regiments went on duty, replacing the Chelomeevskaya UR-100 with the Yangel MR-UR-100.

On April 30, 1975, by decree of the Presidium of the Supreme Soviet of the USSR, the division was awarded the Order of the Red Banner.

On October 3, 1978, two missile regiments with the modernized 15P016 complex with the MR-UR-100U missile went on alert duty.

On December 14, 1979, the division was awarded the pennant of the Ministry of Defense of the USSR "For Courage and Military Valor".

From 1982, according to the General Staff plan, some of the "OS" regiments with MR-UR-100 were taken off alert duty and disbanded, while others were transferred to the improved 15P016 complex.

From March 1986, the division conducted comparative tests of the wheeled launchers 15U157 on the MAZ-7906 and MAZ-7907 chassis (since September) of the 15P162 "Tselina-2" missile complex with the RT-23UTTH missile (15Zh62) weighing 104.5 tons. These tests were carried out on the basis of the division and included building huge hangars and special road sections with bridges and interchanges for testing the destructive effects on asphalt concrete pavement. All work was done only at night and under strict secrecy. The tests were completed in September 1987, with the selection of the launcher on the 12-axle articulated chassis MAZ-7907.

In 1994, the last "OS" missile regiment was taken off alert duty. In accordance with the decision of the Council of Ministers of Russia, a museum of missile troops was organized on the basis of one of the combat launch positions (SHPU) of military unit 14264, which was subsequently disbanded. On December 30, 1994, the first "OS" regiment (military unit 14264) was transferred to the Topol ICBM with the RT-2PM missile (15Zh58). On December 27, 1996, the second regiment (military unit 52642) "Topols" went on alert duty. In the fall of 1996, the combat crews of the missile regiments of the division carried out two successful training and combat launches at the Plesetsk test site.

The annual holiday is on July 14.

Command 
 From May 1960 to 13 April 1970 – major general Petr Petrovich Uvarov
 From 13 April 1970, to 21 November 1973 – major general Yuri S. Marsac
 From 21 November 1973, to 3 December 1977 – major general Alexander P. Volkov
 From 3 December 1977, to 4 January 1982 – major general Yevgeny Ivanov
 From 4 January 1982, to 31 July 1986 – major general Viktor Khramchenkov
 From 31 July 1986, to 14 July 1998 – major general Alexander Gribov
 From 14 July 1998, to 4 July 2000 – major general Aleksey Abramov
 From 4 June 2000, to 2006 – major general Anatoly Shura
 From June 2006 to December 2009 – major general Ivan Nikolaevich Kuzichkin
 From December 2009 to May 2011 – colonel Alexander M. Galaktionov
 From July 2011 to August 2013 – colonel Andrei Anatolyevich Burbin
 From August 2013 to April 2016 – colonel Oleg Vyacheslavovich Lankin
 From April 2016 – major general Maxim Vladimirovich Ryabchenko
 From December 2020 – colonel Andrey Nikolaevich Malinin

Subordinate units 

The division included 11 missile regiments:
 129th missile regiment (military unit 97688) - disbanded 1 December 1989
 222nd missile regiment (military unit 95835) - disbanded 7 January 1990
 319th missile regiment (military unit 52643) - disbanded 1 December 1989
 320th missile regiment (military unit 52644) - disbanded 1 December 1989
 509th missile regiment (military unit 52641) - disbanded 30 January 1990
 510th Guards missile Tver regiment (military unit 52642) (site 3k)
 818th missile regiment (military unit 74201) (51st site) - disbanded 1 December 1993
 272nd missile regiment (military unit 68528) (42nd site), - disbanded
 342nd Guards missile regiment (military unit 57338) - disbanded 30 October 1990
 256th (526) missile regiment (military unit 07382) (11th site, 12th site), - disbanded 1 October 1993
 41st missile regiment (military unit 14264) (site 1C)

Other military formations:
 281st Communication Centre (military unit 03394), since 2012 military unit 14245-B (US)
 Communications Repair Base (CRB) (military unit 40262)
 212nd separate group of regulations for combat control and communication means (SGRCC CM) as part of the 1193rd combat control center (CCC) (military unit 49494) 606310, Nizhny Novgorod region, Dalnee Konstantinovo-5
 2423rd technical missile base (TMB) (military unit 96778) (platform 5, 6)
 1501st repair and technical base (RTB) (military unit 33787)
 509th separate engineer-demining battalion  (military unit 03071)
 41st operational and technical commandant's office (military unit 63627), pos. Ozerny, st. Sovetskaya, 7
 29th Separate Helicopter Squadron at Vypolzovo (air base) (military unit 65177) - disbanded in December 2001
 guard and reconnaissance battalion (GRB) (military unit 14245)
 61st station (postal service) (military unit 80253)
 separate operational and regulatory group (SORG) (military unit 14245-R) - disbanded
 3rd separate medical and sanitary battalion (SMSB) (military unit 46181)
 9th mobile car repair shop (MCRS) (military unit 14245-D)
 261st complex technical control unit (CTCU) (military unit 14245-R)
 military school for junior specialists (MSJS) (military unit 14245-B)

Weapons 
In different years, the armaments division standing missile systems:
 In 1963–1977 years. – P-16U (8K64U);
 In 1967–1979 years. – UR-100 (8K84);
 As in 1975–1991. – MR UR-100 (15A15);
 In 1978–1994 years. – MR UR-100U (15A16);
 From 1994 to present. at. –  RT-2PM Topol (15ZH58).

Anniversary  
On 14 July, the Division's Anniversary is celebrated – since 1943 when the 19th Separate Guards artillery gunnery brigade was established.

Notes

Works cited

External links 
 Official Website of the closed Lake – Rocket connection
 Vypolzovo – place in the big history

Rocket divisions of the Soviet Union
Rocket divisions of Russia
Military units and formations established in 1961
Wikipedia articles needing cleanup after translation from Russian